Namna kalan is a town and a nagar panchayat in Surguja district in Indian state of Chhattisgarh.

Demographics
 India census, Namna Kalan had a population of 8914. Males constitute 52% of the population and females 48%. Namna Kalan has an average literacy rate of 73%, higher than the national average of 59.5%: male literacy is 79%, and female literacy is 67%. In Namna Kalan, 14% of the population is under 6 years of age.

References

Cities and towns in Surguja district